Jonathan Niven Cryer (born April 16, 1965) is an American actor, writer, director and producer. Born into a show business family, he made his motion picture debut as a teenage photographer in the 1984 romantic comedy No Small Affair; his breakout role came in 1986, in the John Hughes-written film Pretty in Pink. In 1998, he wrote and produced the independent film Went to Coney Island on a Mission from God... Be Back by Five.

Although he gained fame with his early film roles, it took several years to find success on television as none of his star vehicles, including The Famous Teddy Z, Partners, and The Trouble with Normal, lasted more than 22 episodes. In 2003, he was cast in a co-leading role as Alan Harper on the CBS sitcom Two and a Half Men, a major hit for twelve seasons for which he won two Primetime Emmy Awards (in 2009 and 2012). He received a star on the Hollywood Walk of Fame for Television in 2011.

Cryer's other film appearances include Superman IV: The Quest for Peace (1987), Hiding Out (1987), Hot Shots! (1991), Holy Man (1998), Tortured (2008), Shorts (2009), and Hit by Lightning (2014). He also has appeared in the recurring role of Lex Luthor in the CW series Supergirl, Arrow, and Batwoman.  After appearing on the podcast Crime Writers On... it was announced that he would join the Undisclosed podcast for their second season.

Early life
Cryer was born in New York City. His mother, Gretchen Kiger, is a playwright, songwriter, actress and singer. His father, Donald David Cryer, is an actor and singer who originally studied to be a minister. His paternal grandfather, the Rev. Donald W. Cryer, was a prominent Methodist minister. He has two sisters, Robin and Shelly.

When Cryer was twelve years old, he decided he wanted to become an actor. When his mother heard this, she thought he should have a backup plan, and joked, "Plumbing is a pretty good career." Cryer attended Stagedoor Manor Performing Arts Training Center for several summers as a teenager, and is a 1983 graduate of the Bronx High School of Science. He was classmates with screenwriter and film director Boaz Yakin. To his mother's "great disappointment," he skipped college and went to the Royal Academy of Dramatic Art in London, England, for a summer short course in Shakespeare.

Career

Career beginnings

Cryer's first professional acting effort was as David in the Broadway play Torch Song Trilogy, replacing Matthew Broderick, whom he "closely resembled." He reprised the role in San Francisco and Los Angeles. He was later a standby and replacement for Broderick as Eugene Jerome in the original Broadway production of Neil Simon's Brighton Beach Memoirs in 1984.

At age 19, Cryer appeared in the 1984 romantic comedy film No Small Affair, in the lead role as Charles Cummings, after the original production with Matthew Broderick was shut down when director Martin Ritt suffered a heart attack. He went on to appear in small roles in films and television movies.

Cryer made his film breakthrough as Philip F. "Duckie" Dale in the John Hughes-scripted film Pretty in Pink. In an interview with the Daily News, Cryer's mother Gretchen said that after Pretty in Pink, she started getting calls from teenage girls from all over the world, who would leave hysterical, giggling messages on her answering machine.

Cryer then starred in the 1987 film Hiding Out as a stockbroker on the run from a Mafia hit man. His mother Gretchen played his aunt. The film broke even, but Cryer's performance as a character who was much older than him was critically acclaimed. In 1989, he got the lead role in the TV comedy series The Famous Teddy Z. His performance gained poor reviews and the show was canceled after the first season.

In 1990 Cryer appeared as Sandy in an Off-Broadway adaptation of Carnal Knowledge. That same year he appeared alongside future Two and a Half Men costar Charlie Sheen in the Jim Abrahams comedy Hot Shots!, which was received very positively. Cryer is frequently linked to the Brat Pack. In a March 2009 interview on Anytime with Bob Kushell, Cryer stated that he had auditioned for St. Elmo's Fire but was not cast in a role. In 1993, he was asked to audition for the role of Chandler Bing on Friends, while doing a play in London. His reading was videotaped by a British casting agent but the tape failed to arrive in the U.S. before the network had made its final decision.

In 1995, he was cast as Bob in the sitcom Partners, which, like his prior show The Famous Teddy Z, was canceled after its first season. In an interview with Time Out New York he stated, "Hey, every show I'm in goes down. Think about this: George Clooney was in 28 pilots, or something. It means nothing." After guest starring on shows such as Dharma & Greg and The Outer Limits, he wrote, produced and co-starred in the film Went to Coney Island on a Mission from God... Be Back by Five. It debuted in 1998 at the Los Angeles Film Festival and gained positive reviews from critics. Leonard Maltin from Playboy Magazine called it "a breath of fresh air." That same year, Cryer landed in another TV series, the Fox sitcom Getting Personal, alongside Vivica A. Fox and Duane Martin. Although the show was picked up for a second season after its abbreviated spring run, it was canceled that fall, after airing 17 episodes in total.

In 1999, Cryer appeared as Neal in Jeffrey Sweet's play Bluff at the Victory Gardens Theater. In 2000, he was cast as the lead in a comedy series called The Trouble With Normal. For the third time, Cryer starred in a show which was canceled after its first season.

Two and a Half Men

Cryer's long run of unsuccessful TV projects finally ended in 2003. Against the wishes of CBS executives (who were aware of his past failures) and due to a friendship with Charlie Sheen, he was cast as Alan Harper on the hit comedy series Two and a Half Men. (He had auditioned for the role of Gaius Baltar on the Sci-Fi Channel's reimagined Battlestar Galactica at around the same time, but the role went to James Callis.) Cryer earned seven Primetime Emmy Award nominations and two wins for his acting work on the show. In a comment on the show's high ratings, he said: "When you’re on a show that's fighting for survival every week, you stop trusting your instincts, because you think, ‘My instincts haven't worked so far.’ But when people clearly like the show and are watching it in great numbers, it takes a huge amount of pressure off you. It allows you to trust your instincts and go with what has worked for you before." After Sheen's departure from the series, Cryer's character became the show's main protagonist (with Ashton Kutcher being cast as the co-lead) during the final four seasons. Cryer is the only actor to have appeared in every episode of the series; Sheen was fired in March 2011 and Cryer's on-screen son Angus T. Jones left the series at the end of season 10, after describing the show as "filth" and calling himself a "paid hypocrite." (Jones did return for the series finale.)

Further acting and TV roles

In 2008, Cryer appeared with Laurence Fishburne and James Cromwell in the film Tortured, and in 2009 co-starred with James Spader in the film Shorts.

In 2011, Cryer played the role of David in a concert staging of Stephen Sondheim's musical Company with the New York Philharmonic at Lincoln Center. The all-star cast was headed by Neil Patrick Harris and Patti LuPone. The concert subsequently aired on PBS's Great Performances.

Cryer made a guest appearance on the sitcom series Husbands in its second season. He was initially cast to voice the lead character in DisneyToon Studios' animated film Planes, a spin-off of Pixar's Cars franchise, but later dropped out and was replaced by Dane Cook. Cryer did however receive a credit on the film for "additional story material."

In 2015, Cryer released a book titled So That Happened, a breezy, often comic tale chronicling Cryer's 30-year career on stage, film and television.

Cryer currently appears in the highly popular CBS drama series NCIS, where he currently plays Navy Dr. Cyril Taft who treats NCIS Special Agent Leroy Jethro Gibbs (Mark Harmon). Cryer had expressed a desire to appear in NCIS since it premiered in 2003.

Pursuing a passion for criminal justice, Cryer joined the team of the popular podcast Undisclosed where he will be voicing the weekly addendum episode for the second season.

On May 21, 2018, Cryer was featured in the premier of Episode 1, Season 9 of genealogy program Who Do You Think You Are? Cryer uncovered the dramatic tale of his ancestor James Adams, a Scottish Covenanter soldier who was captured during the Battle of Dunbar in 1650, and endured horrific conditions as a prisoner. He was then transported to America an indentured servant to work at the Saugus Iron Works at Lynn, Massachusetts. As part of his research for the episode, Cryer visited the site of the Battle of Dunbar, Durham Cathedral in Durham, North East England – where surviving Scottish prisoners were held until they were indentured – and the Saugus Iron Works national historic site. Cryer said: "Seeing the resilience of my family over centuries, you can see the legacy he left. I can't help but feel lucky...clearly, the resilience of my family, that spine of steel, was not something that came from nowhere. Moving forward, I'm going to take James Adams' strength as my inspiration and know that when you go through very, very difficult times, if you can turn around and help the people around you who had it even worse, that's real strength. And I aspire to be one of those people."

On November 16, 2018, it was announced that Cryer had been cast as Lex Luthor on The CW's Supergirl in a recurring role. (He had coincidentally played Lenny Luthor, Lex Luthor's nephew, in the 1987 film Superman IV: The Quest for Peace.) His first appearance in the fifteenth episode of Season 4, titled "O Brother, Where Art Thou?". He reprised the role in the Batwoman and The Flash episodes of the Arrowverse crossover Crisis on Infinite Earths.

On April 15, 2019, Cryer joined other WGA writers in firing their agents as part of the WGA's stand against the ATA and the practice of packaging.

Personal life

Cryer married British actress Sarah Trigger in 1999, with whom he has a son, Charlie Austin. They divorced in 2004. On a February 2007 episode of The Tonight Show with Jay Leno, he announced that he was engaged to entertainment reporter Lisa Joyner, whom he married in Mexico in June 2007. On September 29, 2009, they announced that they had adopted a baby girl.

When Pretty in Pink co-star Molly Ringwald told Out magazine in 2012 that she believed Cryer's character was gay, Cryer stated, "I respectfully disagree. I want to stand up for all the slightly effeminate dorks that are actually heterosexual. Just cause the gaydar is going off, doesn't mean your instruments aren't faulty. I've had to live with that, and that’s OK." Also in 2012, he told Jeff Probst that when he and Joyner started dating, she wondered if he might be gay because "he never kissed me." Cryer was asked in 2014 if he was "mistaken for gay"; he called himself "an effeminate heterosexual dork" and made a tongue-in-cheek remark about never being propositioned: "Fellas, you're dropping the ball."

Political views
Prior to the 2008 presidential election, Cryer attended a fundraiser hosted by the McCain campaign and, according to news reports, endorsed John McCain. When Cryer did not make a public endorsement for the 2012 race, his spokeswoman said that the 2008 report aligning him with the Republican Party was a "mistake" and that Cryer was "not really political." He had attended events for both Republicans and Democrats "because he wanted to hear what both sides had to say."

In regard to Donald Trump, Cryer opined on the May 5, 2016, episode of the podcast Never Not Funny, "I have been pointing out, and I have been screaming to the rooftops, that Donald Trump is the Charlie Sheen of politics ... I have to tell you, I love Charlie Sheen, I loved working with him when he was sober, but he was, he's full of shit. He has been full of shit, he has serious addiction. His addiction is obviously serious, drugs, and, but, Trump is just addicted to feeling important. I think if anybody is under the delusion that he cares about anybody in America besides himself, they are stoned and need to rethink their priorities, 'cause it's just ridiculous that's he's gotten as far as he has."

Filmography

Film

Television

Theatre

Book
 So That Happened: A Memoir (2015) - Berkley – .

References

External links

 
 
  (archive)
 
 
 

1965 births
20th-century American male actors
21st-century American male actors
Male actors from New York City
Alumni of RADA
American male film actors
American male television actors
American male voice actors
American television directors
Television producers from New York City
Living people
Outstanding Performance by a Lead Actor in a Comedy Series Primetime Emmy Award winners
Outstanding Performance by a Supporting Actor in a Comedy Series Primetime Emmy Award winners
The Bronx High School of Science alumni